Wan Long may refer to:

 Wān Long, village in Myanmar
 Wan Long (businessman), Chinese billionaire

See also
Wang Long